All India Darjeeling Gold Cup, also known as All India Brigade of Gorkha's Gold Cup Football Tournament, or simply GTA Chairman's Gold Cup, is an Indian association football tournament held in Darjeeling and organized by the Indian Darjeeling Gorkha Hills Sports Association (DGHSA). The tournament debuted in 1975. Apart from some top clubs from Calcutta Football League West Bengal, clubs from other Indian states also participated in the tournament.

All matches are held at Gorkha Stadium in Darjeeling.

Results

References 

Football cup competitions in India
Football in Darjeeling
1975 establishments in India
Recurring sporting events established in 1975